Jerdacuttup River is a river located in the Goldfields-Esperance region of Western Australia.
The water in the river is naturally saline.

The river rises on the edge of the Yilgarn Plateau north of Ravensthorpe below Mount Short and drains the eastern side of the Ravensthorpe Range before flowing south and draining into the Jerdacuttup lakes close to the Southern Ocean and east of Hopetoun.

The tributaries of the river include Moolyall Creek, Woodenup Creek, Cordingup Creek, Carlingup Creek, Boaiup Creek, Bandalup Creek and Burlabup Creek.

The name is Indigenous Australian in origin and first charted by John Forrest in 1870.

The river is the location of a significant komatiite deposit

See also
Widgiemooltha Komatiite

References

Rivers of the Goldfields-Esperance region